Quality King Distributors Inc. v. L'anza Research International Inc., 523 U.S. 135 (1998), was a decision by the United States Supreme Court over whether a copyright holder could restrict redistribution of material containing copyrighted  content (authorized by the copyright holder) which is imported into the United States as so-called "grey market" goods.

Opinion of the Court 
The Supreme Court found that the copyright holder could not prevent re-importation of the products it had authorized for export from the United States.

This case did not address the importation of products made outside the United States under authority of the copyright holder.  The Court addressed that issue in Kirtsaeng v. John Wiley & Sons, Inc., 568 U.S. 519 (2013), holding that those sales were also qualifying "first sales", and that copyright holders could not restrict trafficking of those works after those sales.

See also 
 First-sale doctrine
 List of United States Supreme Court cases, volume 523
 List of United States Supreme Court cases
 Lists of United States Supreme Court cases by volume

External links
 

United States Supreme Court cases
United States copyright case law
1998 in United States case law
United States Supreme Court cases of the Rehnquist Court